Castlemaine was an electoral district of the Legislative Assembly in the Australian state of Victoria from 1859 to 1904. It included the towns of Castlemaine, Muckleford and Harcourt.

It was preceded by the Electoral district of Castlemaine Boroughs, which existed from 1856 to 1859 and was one of the original districts of the Victorian Legislative Assembly.

In 1904 the district of Castlemaine was abolished, and a new electorate, the Electoral district of Castlemaine and Maldon, was created. One of the last members of Castlemaine, Harry Lawson, represented Castlemaine and Maldon from 1904 to 1927.

Members for Castlemaine
Three members were initially elected. Two members from May 1877.

 = by-election
 = disqualified
 = resigned

References

Former electoral districts of Victoria (Australia)
1859 establishments in Australia
1904 disestablishments in Australia